Marcus Mojigoh (born 21 June 1951) is a Malaysian politician who served as the Member of Parliament (MP) for Putatan from March 2004 to May 2018. He also serves as Chairman of Cocoa Board and Saham Berhad of Sabah. He is presently again an independent. He was a member of the Homeland Solidarity Party (STAR), a component party of the ruling Gabungan Rakyat Sabah (GRS) and Perikatan Nasional (PN) coalitions and was a member of the United Progressive Kinabalu Organisation (UPKO), then component party of the ruling Barisan Nasional (BN) coalition. He also served as Division Chief of UPKO of Putatan.

Political career 
Mojigoh's first political party was UPKO in the Barisan Nasional Sabah coalition. Mojigoh was elected to federal Parliament in the 2004 election using BN-UPKO logo defeating a People's Justice Party (PKR) candidate for the seat of Putatan. In 2018, he agreed with UPKO president Wilfred Madius Tangau to leave BN after the coalition defeat in 2018 Malaysian general election. In 2020, he left UPKO and became an independent. On 11 December 2021, Mojigoh unveiled that he had joined the STAR under the leadership of Jeffrey Kitingan a day prior on 10 December 2021. On 24 August 2022, Mojigoh left STAR after only eight months with the party as there were "limitations of freedom of speech" which prohibited him from "speak up" if remained in the party. He elaborated that he could not criticise STAR or Sabah state government leaders as he "always speak up on what is right and good for citizens of Malaysia and Sabah". On his political career and future, Mojigoh added that he would remain independent for the time being as he might "stay free for the moment and I am free to say what I would like to say as a political activist as I am not too tied up with any political party". In addition, Mojigoh revealed that he had been invited by many political parties to join them but he was still thinking about it. "It depends on the leader, if they trust me and give me a role to play then I will consider it, that are all I want, which is something Sabahans will be happy about, not so much about this project or that project." Mojigoh also shared that any political platform that could offer stability to the country should be supported, "I think it is very important for us to form a very strong government because at the moment, both the State and Federal governments are in pieces ... we do not know what is going to happen tomorrow".

Election results

Honours
  :
  Companion of the Order of Loyalty to the Crown of Malaysia (JSM) (2007)
  Commander of the Order of Meritorious Service (PJN) - Datuk (2017)

References 

Living people
1951 births
Members of the Dewan Rakyat
United Progressive Kinabalu Organisation politicians
People from Sabah
Kadazan-Dusun people
Companions of the Order of Loyalty to the Crown of Malaysia
Commanders of the Order of Meritorious Service